Nantai Temple is a Buddhist temple located on Mount Heng, in Nanyue District of Hengyang, Hunan, China. It is considered the ancestral temple of Caodong school, Fayan school and Yunmen school, and has also been classified as a National Key Buddhist Temple in Han Chinese Area in 1983.

History
Nantai Temple was first built in the Tianjian period of Liang dynasty (502-557) by Master Haiyin.

In 742, in the 2nd year of Tianbao period of Tang dynasty (618-907), Shitou Xiqian came to build a Buddhist temple here.

During the Hongzhi period (502-519) of Ming dynasty (1368-1644), a Buddhist temple was rebuilt by Master Wu'ai. 

During the Qianlong period of Qing dynasty (1644-1911), buildings and halls of Nantai Temple collapsed for neglect. In 1899, in the 25th year of Guangxu period, the reconstruction works started and lasted 5 years. In 1907, a Japanese Buddhist monk named  donated 5,700 volumes of Buddhist scriptures and 32 palm leaf manuscripts to the temple. 

During the Cultural Revolution, the red guards had attacked the temple. 5,700 volumes of Buddhist scriptures and 32 palm leaf manuscripts were either stolen, damaged or destroyed. Many original Buddha statues and musical instruments of the temple had been vandalised or destroyed.  After the Third Plenary Session of the 11th Central Committee of the Chinese Communist Party, according to the national policy of free religious belief, Nantai Temple was reconstructed and reopened. In 1981, a Thai Chinese couple Huang Zhangren and Ouyang Yu presented a gilt bronze Buddha statue to the temple. In 1983, Nantai Temple was rated as a National Key Buddhist Temple in Han Chinese Area. In 1987, Master Baotan was proposed as abbot of the temple. Under his leadership, the temple began a large-scale reconstruction project.

Gallery

References

External links

Buddhist temples in Hunan
Nanyue District